The Capricornian was a newspaper published in Rockhampton, Queensland from 1875 to 1929.

History 
The Capricornian was published from 2 January 1875 to 26 December 1929 in Rockhampton, Queensland. It merged with the Artesian to form the Central Queensland Herald. It was published by Charles Hardie Buzacott.

Digitisation 
The paper has been digitised as part of the Australian Newspapers Digitisation Program  of the National Library of Australia.

See also
 List of newspapers in Australia

References

External links 
 

Capricornian
Rockhampton